Thomas Nicol (1846–1916) was Professor of Biblical Criticism at the University of Aberdeen. He served as Moderator of the General Assembly of the Church of Scotland in 1914.

Life

He was born in Edinburgh on 21 October 1846, possibly the son of Rev John Nicol, living at 11 Hill Place.

He was educated at Edinburgh Academy.

He was minister of Kells in Galloway 1873 to 1879 and minister of the Tolbooth Kirk in Edinburgh 1879 to 1898/9.

In 1898 he was appointed Professor of Divinity and Biblical Criticism at the University of Aberdeen, replacing Prof David Johnston.

In 1907 he delivered The Baird Lecture entitled "The Four Gospels in the Earliest Church History".

In the early 20th century he lived at 53 College Bounds in Aberdeen.

He died at Skelmorlie on 7 August 1916 and is buried in the Grange Cemetery in Edinburgh. The grave lies close to the south-east corner.

Family

He was married to Annie Underwood (1857–1934).

Their children included Thomas Nicol (1875–1972) John Underwood Nicol (1884–1946).

Publications

Recent Archaeology and the Bible (1897)
Analytical Concordance to the Bible (1911) (with William Barron Stevenson)
Syriac Versions of the Bible (1915)

References

1846 births
1916 deaths
Clergy from Edinburgh
Academics from Edinburgh
Moderators of the General Assembly of the Church of Scotland
Academics of the University of Aberdeen
People educated at Edinburgh Academy
Burials at the Grange Cemetery